Yuriy Maksimenko is a Ukrainian retired footballer.

Career
Yuriy Maksimenko started his career in 2000 for one season with Stal-2 Alchevsk. In 2003 he moved to Nyva Ternopil where he played 14 matches and scoring 2 goals. In 2004 he moved to Sogdiana Jizzakh in Uzbekistan, then he moved to FC Shahdag Qusar in Azerbaijan. In 2006 he returned to Ukraine on the side of Nyva Vinnytsia where he played 2 matches and in 2007 he moved to Stroitel Pripyat where he played 8 matches and scored 2 goals. He also played for 3 matches for kazatin and 12 matches with Bukovyna Chernivtsi and scoring 2 goals. In January 2009 he moved to Desna Chernihiv, the club in the city of Chernihivi where he played 1 match and also he played for Desna-2 Chernihiv for the regional competition. Then he moved to Putrovka.

References

External links 
 Yuriy Maksimenko at footballfacts.ru
 Yuriy Maksimenko at allplayers.in.ua

1981 births
Living people
FC Desna Chernihiv players
FC Stal-2 Alchevsk players
FC Sogdiana Jizzakh players
FC Nyva Vinnytsia players
FC Stroitel Pripyat players
FC Bukovyna Chernivtsi players
Ukrainian footballers
Ukrainian Premier League players
Ukrainian First League players
Ukrainian Second League players
Ukrainian expatriate sportspeople in Uzbekistan
Ukrainian expatriate sportspeople in Azerbaijan
Expatriate footballers in Uzbekistan
Expatriate footballers in Azerbaijan
Association football defenders